PATTS College of Aeronautics, also known as Philippine Air Transport and Training Services, is an aeronautical school at Lombos Ave., Brgy. San Isidro, Parañaque, Metro Manila, Philippines. It was founded by Atty. Ambrosio R. Valdez Sr.

History
PATTS College of Aeronautics was founded in 1969 as the Philippine Air Transport and Training Services. The unfavorable investment climate at the time constrained the founders to drop the first objective and only organize and operate an educational institution, intended to provide professional and technical training to its clients. The school started with two-year airframe mechanic and two-year power plant mechanic courses. In its second year of operation, the two-year communication technician course (avionics) and the four-year aeronautical engineering course were added.

Under the stewardship of its board of directors, the school rose to higher levels of credit and educational standards. Its BS Aeronautical Engineering graduates regularly topped the PRC’s Licensure Board Examination for Aeronautical Engineers from its inception in 1983. In 1989, the school became an accredited college. PATS School of Aeronautics grew into a larger educational institution known as PATTS College of Aeronautics, adapting the slogan “Fly high, your future is in the skies”.

In 2005, the school's greatest transformation coincided with PATTS' 36th anniversary.  PATTS was relocated from its old site at Domestic Airport Road, Pasay to its new home at Lombos Avenue, San Isidro, Parañaque. Educational success encouraged the Board of Directors to be more forward-thinking in their management of the school. Following the 36th Anniversary, management announced a new diversification. PATTS would offer non-aviation related programs responsive to industry needs, starting with B.S. Hotel and Restaurant Management as of the 2005–2006 school year. Feasibility studies are being conducted to determine what other curricular offerings are viable. Graduate Studies is also a possibility, leading to university status.

Academic program
PATTS course offerings are recognized by the Commission on Higher Education (CHED) and the Technical Education and Skills Development Authority (TESDA). The Civil Aviation Authority of the Philippines (CAAP) certifies that PATTS is an Aircraft Maintenance School, rated for Airframe and Power Plant. Aircraft frames and power plants are available for PATTS students to work on, dismantle and assemble in the laboratories under the direct supervision of duly licensed personnel. PATTS graduates are also required to undergo on-the-job training with aviation companies such as Philippine Airlines, Air Philippines, Cebu Pacific, Philippine Aerospace Development Corporation and the Philippine Air Force. This training prepares graduates of PATTS for integration into the industry.

Courses offered

College
Bachelor of Science in Aeronautical Engineering
Bachelor of Science in Industrial Engineering
Bachelor of Science in Air Transportation
Bachelor of Science in Avionics Technology
Bachelor of Science in Aircraft Maintenance Technology
Bachelor of Science in Airline Business Administration
Bachelor of Science in Tourism Management
Bachelor of Science in Hotel and Restaurant Management
Aircraft Technician Course (2-year course)

Senior High School
STEM (Science, Technology, Engineering and Mathematics)
ABM (Accountancy, Business and Management)

Publications

Aeroscope magazine

Aeroscope magazine is the official publication of PATTS College of Aeronautics. It is published quarterly to provide readers with the latest updates from the aviation industry and inform them about school-related activities. It operates independently from all other parts of the school. It is essentially a technical magazine and is published in English and Filipino

Student organizations
The following are recognized organizations in the campus:

Program Oriented Organizations
Airline Business Administration Society (ABASOC)
Aeronautical Engineering Research Organization (AERO)
Aircraft Technician Organization (ATO)
Alliance of Aircraft Mechanic Troubleshooters (AAMT)
Community of Hospitality and Education in Food Services (CHEFS)
Guild of Air Transportation Students (GATS)
PATTS Avionics Society (PAVIOS)
PATTS Tourism Society (PTS)
Society of PATTS Industrial Engineering Students (SPIES)

Special Interest Organizations
PATTS College of Aeronautics Alumni Association
PATTS Student Council (PSC)
PATTS Achievers League (PAL)
Christian Brotherhood International (CBI)
Joint Photographers Group (JPG)
PATTS Achievers in Mission (PAM)
PATTS Association of Radio Control Aircraft Modellers (PARCAM)
PATTS Association of Science Enthusiasts (PASE)
PATTS Body Building Club (PBBC)
PATTS Campus Christian Ministry (PCCM)
PATTS Corps of Sponsors (PCOS)
PATTS Dance Company (PDC)
PATTS Debaters Club (PDC)
PATTS Green Ambassadors (PGA)
PATTS Innovative Computer Society (PICS)
PATTS International Students Organization (PISO)
PATTS Martial Arts Club (PMAC)
PATTS Mathematics Society (PMS)
PATTS Organization of Performing Arts (POP-ART)
PATTS Otaku Alliance (POA)
PATTS ROTARACT Club (PRC)
PATTS Rescue Team (PRT)
PATTS U - Knighted Chess Club (U-KCC)
PATTS Universal League of Singing Enthusiasts (PULSE)
PATTS Vocal Harmony (PVH)
Social Science Society (SSS)
United Collegiate PATTS Organization (UCPO)
PATTS STEM Society (PSS)
PATTS ABM Society (PAS)
PATTS Seahorse Network (PSN)

Notable alumni
Isabel Granada, actress
Paulie Yllana, actor
Sherman Tupas, bassist of Filipino rock band Kaligta
Christian C. Javier, Arena Chess Grandmaster - 2018, ICCF Correspondence Chess Expert - 2021, Correspondence Chess Master - 2022 FIDE International Chess Organizer - 2021, National Arbiter of the Phils. - 2012, FIDE National Arbiter of Phils. - 2013.
Irene M. Alcantara, Female Chess Arbiter of (CAUP) and Recognized by NCFP

See also
Parañaque

References

External links
www.patts.edu.ph official website

Universities and colleges in Metro Manila
Aviation schools in the Philippines
Education in Parañaque